Brigadier Adrian Clements Gore  (14 May 1900 – 7 June 1990) was a British Army officer who served with distinction in World War II. He won fame as a schoolboy cricketer for Eton College and was named as a Wisden Cricketer of the Year in 1919.

Early life
Gore was born at Ayr in Scotland in 1900, the only child of Army officer Robert Clements Gore, CB, CMG, and his wife Rachel Cecilia (daughter of Llewellyn Traherne Bassett Saunderson, JP and Lady Rachel Mary Scott, daughter of the 3rd Earl of Clonmell). At birth he was initially believed to have been still born and was placed to one side to be buried until a nurse noticed that the child was alive. 
He was a descendant of Sir William Gore, 3rd Baronet. Gore was educated at Eton College and the Royal Military College, Sandhurst.

Gore's father served in the Argyll and Sutherland Highlanders in the Second Boer War and in India before serving in France during World War I. He rose to the rank of Brigadier-General and was commanding the 101st Brigade in Belgium when he was killed in action in April 1918 aged 50. He is buried at Lijssenthoek Military Cemetery near Ypres.

Cricket
Gore was a "naturally gifted all-round sportsman" who Wisden described as having "a touch of genius". He played games such as racquets at school but played little cricket before 1918, his final year at Eton. During the 1918 season he shot to fame as a fast-medium bowler with a devastating late in-swing who demolished both adult and other schoolboy cricketers. He took 51 wickets in all that season, at an average of 7.51 runs per wicket. With no first-class cricket played in the season, Wisden picked Gore and four other public school cricketers for its annual five Cricketers of the Year feature.

From 1921 to 1932, he played 16 first-class matches, mainly for The Army although he appeared twice for the Combined Services against touring international sides and once for the Gentlemen in the 1925 Gentlemen v Players match at Folkestone. He took a total of 52 first-class career wickets at a bowling average of 21 runs apiece.

Military career
After passing out from Sandhurst, Gore was commissioned as a second lieutenant into the Rifle Brigade (The Prince Consort's Own) on 17 December 1919. He served during most of the interwar period with the 2nd Battalion of his regiment, initially in Ireland during the Irish War of Independence and then in Turkey and Malta.

By the outbreak of World War II in September 1939, Gore was training officer for the Rifle Brigade and was serving at the regimental depot at Winchester. In 1941 he was selected to command the Green Jackets Officer Cadet Training Unit (OCTU). The Rifle Brigade, along with the King's Royal Rifle Corps (KRRC), provided the motorised infantry battalions for the British Army's armoured divisions.

He remained in this role until the following year when he was given command of the 10th Battalion, Rifle Brigade during the Tunisian campaign. He rose to the rank of Brigadier, commanding the 7th Motor Brigade, before moving to the 2nd Infantry Brigade which he served with at the Anzio beachhead, before taking command of 61st Infantry Brigade throughout the remainder of the Italian campaign. He commanded the 6th Armoured Division while the division was on occupation duty in Austria from May 1945 and later at Verona between September 1945 and March 1946.

Personal life
In 1927, Gore married Enid Aimée (1902−1997), daughter of John Jameson Cairnes, of Horton Priory, Sellindge, Kent. They had a son, Major Toby Clements Gore (b. 1927), of the Rifle Brigade, High Sheriff of Berkshire in 1993, and two daughters: Dinah (1930−1987), who married Lt-Col J. Richard S. Besly (1931-2019), of the Grenadier Guards, and had two sons and three daughters; and Belinda (b. 1940), who married Sir Anthony Frederick Milbank, 5th Baronet, and had two sons and a daughter.

Death
Gore died in June 1990 at Horton Priory, aged 90, survived by his son and younger daughter.

References

Bibliography

External links
Generals of World War II

1900 births
1990 deaths
British military personnel of the Irish War of Independence
British Army brigadiers of World War II
British Army cricketers
Combined Services cricketers
Companions of the Distinguished Service Order
English cricketers
Gentlemen cricketers
People educated at Eton College
People from Dunoon
Rifle Brigade officers
Wisden Cricketers of the Year
People from Ayr
Scottish military personnel
Graduates of the Royal Military College, Sandhurst